= Konganeeswarar Temple =

Temple in India

Konganeeswarar Temple is a Hindu temple situated on West Main Street, Thanjavur. The principal deity is Konganeeswarar and his consorts Gnanambal and Annapoorani. The temple is associated with the saint Kongana Siddhar.
